Daizangi, also spelled as Dai Zangi,, is one of the major tribes of the Hazaras of Hazarajat in central Afghanistan. They inhabit the Bamyan, Yakawlang, Panjab and Waras districts of Bamyan Province, the Shahristan in Daikundi Province, and Lal Wa Sarjangal in Ghor Province. The 19th-century Hazara Mir Elkhani, Mir Naser Beg, Mir Azeem Beg was the mir of the Daizangi who led the final battle of the Hazaras against Abdur Rahman Khan in the battle of Uruzgan. He was exiled to Bokhara in present-day Uzbekistan, where he wrote his memoirs "Yad e Guzishta", Memories of the past. The Daizangi sub-tribes include the Bubali, Gedi, Kamyaba, Kut-daghi, Khushamadi, Kirigu, Miramur, Qaraqul Daghi, Sag Deh, Sag Jui, Sag-Pae, Sehpai, Takana, Takash, Urarus, and Yangur.

See also 
 List of Hazara tribes
 Daizangi

References 

Hazara tribes
Hazara people